A circle of stars often represents unity, solidarity and harmony in flags, seals and signs, and is also seen in iconographic motifs related to the Woman of the Apocalypse as well as in Baroque allegoric art that sometimes depicts the Crown of Immortality.

Woman of the Apocalypse

The New Testament's Book of Revelation (12:1, 2 & 5) describes the Woman of the Apocalypse: And there appeared a great wonder in heaven; a woman clothed with the sun, and the moon under her feet, and upon her head a crown of twelve stars.  And she being with child cried, travailing in birth. .... And she brought forth a man child, who was to rule all nations with a rod of iron:and her child was caught up unto God, and to his throne. In Catholic tradition she has been identified with the Blessed Virgin Mary, especially in connection with the Immaculate Conception.  Mary is often pictured with a crown or Circle of Stars.

The doctrine of the Immaculate Conception was somewhat controversial in the medieval church, and the liturgical Office for the feast was only established in 1615.  In 1649, Francisco Pacheco (father-in-law of Velázquez) published his Art of Painting firmly establishing the detailed correct iconography for paintings of the Virgin of the Immaculate Conception, which included the circle of stars (he also advised the inquisition in Seville on artistic matters).  This was followed by Murillo and his school in very many paintings, and influenced non-Spanish depictions.

European Flag

The European flag, first adopted by the Council of Europe, consists of 12 golden stars in a circle on a blue background. The stars symbolise the ideals of unity, solidarity and harmony among the peoples of Europe. The number of stars has nothing to do with the number of member countries, though the circle is a symbol of unity.

Arsène Heitz, one of the flag designers, in 1987 revealed that his inspiration was the crown of twelve stars of the Woman of the Apocalypse, often found in modern Marian iconography. However, he did not suggest that the finished design held a religious meaning.
Paul M. G. Lévy, the official responsible for the design process, denied any religious inspiration for the flag design.

Zodiac

The Zodiac is an ancient circle of stars where some stars are symbolically combined into 12 star signs also known as constellations. The etymology of the term Zodiac comes from the Latin zōdiacus, from the Greek ζῳδιακός [κύκλος], meaning "[circle] of animals", derived from ζῴδιον, the diminutive of ζῷον "animal".

Crown of Immortality
The Crown of Immortality is a separate and earlier motif (and metaphor) which also uses a circle of stars.  It has been widely used since the Early Church as a metaphor for the reward awaiting martyrs, but they are not depicted in art wearing a circle of stars.  In art the use is mainly in Baroque allegorical compositions, and those with Ariadne.

Art gallery

Religious

Non religious

Flags

Seals

See also
Astral crown
Celestial crown
Crown of Immortality

External links
The Archetype Form [Model]

References

Virgin Mary in art
Iconography
Symbols of the European Union
Visual motifs